"Paninaro" is a song by English synth-pop duo Pet Shop Boys. Originally a B-side to the 1986 single "Suburbia", it was released as a limited-edition single in Italy that same year.

In 1995, a re-recording titled "Paninaro '95" was released to a wider market, to promote the duo's B-side compilation album Alternative (though only the original version was included on the compilation).

Background
The song is about the 1980s Italian youth subculture known as the paninari; derived from the word panino, Italian for sandwich, they were known for congregating in restaurants serving sandwiches and in the first US-style fast food restaurants, as well as their preference for designer clothing and 1980s pop music such as the New Romantic music of Italo disco. Neil Tennant has said that they were drawn to the concept due to having shared those preferences.

Lyrics
"Paninaro" is one of the few Pet Shop Boys songs in which Chris Lowe provides the majority of the vocals. Tennant, meanwhile, only sings the title repeatedly in intervals.

The main lyrical motif consists of eight words:
Passion and love and sex and money
Violence, religion, injustice and death

These words are repeated at the end of the song in a soliloquy to the singer's "lover".

In reference to the fashion of the paninari, references to prestigious Italian fashion designers are repeated throughout the song:
Armani, Armani, ah-ah-Armani
Versace, cinque

(Although Versace was removed from the 7-inch B-side and from the 1995 version.)

In addition, the middle of the song contains a sample from a statement by Lowe within a 1986 Entertainment Tonight interview with the band:

According to Neil Tennant, the song's lyrics Woh, woh, woh, which he provided as backup vocals, were influenced by the song "Tarzan Boy" by Baltimora. He clarified this by stating "We wrote it because you could go 'woh, woh, woh.' We were obsessed with songs that had 'woh, woh, woh' in them. Remember 'Tarzan Boy' by Baltimora?".

Release
The song was included on the 1998 compilation album Essential. An extended mix was included on the 1986 remix album Disco, and on the companion disc to the 2001 remastered re-release of their 1986 debut album Please, called Further Listening 1984–1986.

1995 version
The new recording included a rap in the middle of the song, newly written by Lowe; it laments the loss of the "lover" referred to in the pre-existing lyrics. The written lyrics in the final are also changed to "were" rather than "are" in referring to the lost love.

The 1995 version received remixes from Angel Moraes, Tin Tin Out, and Tracy & Sharon. Tom Stephan of Tracy & Sharon would continue to remix for the Pet Shop Boys as his later alias Superchumbo.

The 1995 version is included on the 2003 compilation album PopArt: The Hits and the 2001 double-disc reissue of Bilingual.

Critical reception
Music & Media wrote, "Re-released to draw attention to the vital Alternative Pet Shop Boys sampler which contains all the B-sides, this is abundant proof of who's got the best melodies in electro pop."

Music videos

Original
A self-produced music video, filmed in Italy, was used for the original release; it consisted of footage of the duo singing the song alongside locals.

1995 version
The "Paninaro '95" video was directed by long-time Pet Shop Boys director Howard Greenhalgh. The Top of the Pops performance of "Paninaro '95" replicated the imagery of the music video, with the same costumes, lighting, and male dancers involved.

Track listings
Italian limited-edition 12-inch single (1986)
A. "Paninaro" (Italian Remix) – 8:40
B. "Paninaro" (Ian Levine Mix) – 9:43

UK CD 1 (1995)
 "Paninaro '95" (Extended Mix) – 7:30
 "Paninaro '95" (Tin Tin Out Mix) – 7:47
 "Paninaro '95" (Tracy's 12' Mix) – 8:30
 "Paninaro '95" (Sharon's Sexy Boyz Dub) – 5:47
 "Paninaro '95" (Angel Moraes' Deep Dance Mix) – 10:39

UK CD 2 (1995)
 "Paninaro '95" – 4:10
 "In the Night '95" – 4:24
 "Girls & Boys" (Pet Shop Boys live in Rio) – 5:04

UK 12-inch single – The Remixes Part One (1995)
A1. "Paninaro '95" (Tracy's 12″ Mix) – 8:28
A2. "Paninaro '95" (Sharon's Sexy Boyz Dub) – 5:47
B1. "Paninaro '95" (Tin Tin Out Mix) – 7:47
B2. "Paninaro '95" (Pet Shop Boys Extended Mix) – 7:30

UK 12-inch single – The Remixes Part Two (1995)
A. "Paninaro '95" (Angel Moraes' Deep Dance Mix) – 10:39
B1. "Paninaro '95" (Angel Moraes' Girls Boys in Dub) – 11:57
B2. "Paninaro '95" (Angel Moraes' The Hot N Spycy Dub) – 9:35

Charts

References

1986 songs
1995 singles
Parlophone singles
Pet Shop Boys songs
Music videos directed by Howard Greenhalgh
Songs written by Chris Lowe
Songs written by Neil Tennant